Vladimir Soares Forbs (born 14 April 1992) is a Bissau-Guinean football midfielder who currently plays for Louletano in Portugal.

References

External links
Corgoň Liga profile
Futbalnet profile

Voetbalkrant profile

1992 births
Living people
Bissau-Guinean footballers
Association football midfielders
Bissau-Guinean expatriate footballers
FC Osaka players
FC Nitra players
F.C. Tirsense players
Atlético Clube de Portugal players
S.C. Praiense players
C.D. Mafra players
Louletano D.C. players
Campeonato de Portugal (league) players
Liga Portugal 2 players
Slovak Super Liga players
Expatriate footballers in Portugal
Expatriate footballers in Slovakia
Expatriate footballers in Japan
Bissau-Guinean expatriate sportspeople in Portugal
Bissau-Guinean expatriate sportspeople in Slovakia
Bissau-Guinean expatriate sportspeople in Japan